Vanadium(III) iodide is the inorganic compound with the formula VI3.  This paramagnetic solid is generated by the reaction of vanadium powder with iodine at around 500 °C.  The black hygroscopic crystals dissolve in water to give green solutions, characteristic of V(III) ions.

The purification of vanadium metal by the chemical transport reaction involving the reversible formation of vanadium(III) iodides in the presence of iodine and its subsequent decomposition to yield pure metal:
 2 V  +  3 I2   ⇌   2 VI3
VI3 crystallizes in the motif adopted by bismuth(III) iodide: the iodides are hexagonal-closest packed and the vanadium centers occupy one third of the octahedral holes.

When solid samples are heated, the gas contains VI4, which is probably the volatile vanadium component in the vapor transport method.  Thermal decomposition of the triiodide leaves a residue of vanadium(II) iodide:
 2 VI3   →   VI2  +  VI4  ΔH = 36.6 kcal/mol; ΔS = 38.7 e.u.

References

Iodides
Metal halides
Vanadium(III) compounds